The 2021–22 Naisten Liiga season was the thirty-ninth season of the Naisten Liiga, the premier level of women's ice hockey in Finland, since the league's establishment as the Naisten SM-sarja in 1982. The season began on 11 September 2021 and concluded on 20 March 2022.

League business

Offseason

HPK Kiekkonaiset team transfer 
In June 2021, it was announced that the HPK Kiekkonaiset team would be transferred to HPK Liiga Oy, owner of the Liiga team HPK and the U20 SM-sarja team HPK U20. HPK Kiekkonaiset had previously been a part of the HPK-affiliated junior club HPK Edustusjääkiekko Ry, a non-profit association. According to Antti Toivanen, CEO of HPK Liiga Oy and general manager of the HPK men's team, the move was motivated by an interest in capitalizing on the growing women's ice hockey market, which was highlighted by the record crowds that attended the 2019 IIHF Women's World Championship in Espoo. Jorma Hassinen, general manager of HPK Kiekkonaiset, expressed hope that the transfer would allow female players to develop with the same opportunities as their male counterparts.

Financial support for RoKi players 
Rovaniemen Kiekko ry announced it would begin supporting RoKi Naiset ice hockey players selected to women’s national team camps and evaluation tournaments with grants of several hundred to a thousand euros. RoKi Naiset head coach Tuomas Liitola stated the club’s long-term goal is to reduce the cost of playing with RoKi Naiset to zero.

Coaching changes

Player signings of note 
Note: The following tables do not include all player movements made during the Naisten Liiga season but rather feature moves involving national team players or international players, extra-league moves, and player movements determined to be otherwise notable. 

Pre-season

Preliminaries

Divisional series

Teams

Preliminary series 
The preliminary series began on 11 September and concluded on 12 December 2021. The Finnish Ice Hockey Association opted to use the points per game ranking system first implemented in the 2020–21 season to allow for the potential of cancelled matches due to the COVID-19 pandemic. Some games in the preliminary series were rescheduled, however, each team was able to play all twenty matches.

The top six ranked teams in the preliminaries advanced to the regular season, also called the upper division series and were guaranteed playoff berths.

Standings

Official ranking

Teams were officially ranked by average points per game with ties broken by greater number of games played, followed by best goal difference, then greater number of goals.

Schedule

Major events 

 26 September 2021 – Ilves 3–0 TPS, Tesoman jäähalli (Tampere)TPS forward Maija Otamo was issued a six-game ban – the longest suspension ever handed down to a player in the Naisten Liiga – after rendering Ilves forward Emilia Varpula unconscious with two hits in the head and neck area. The hits came with just nine seconds left on the clock and less than a minute after Varpula contributed an assist to Ilves’ third and final goal in the eventual shutout. Varpula was taken directly from the ice to hospital by ambulance and was ultimately diagnosed with a concussion. Following the hits, a fight broke out between TPS forward Estelle Duvin and Ilves defenseman Elli Suoranta, resulting in one game suspensions for both players.

Player statistics 
Scoring leaders

The following players led the league in points at the conclusion of games the preliminaries on 12 December 2021. 

 

The following skaters were the top point scorers of teams not represented in the scoring leader table at the conclusion of the preliminary series, noted with their overall league scoring rank:

22. Johanna Juutilainen (F), KalPa: 18 GP, 6 G, 13 A, 19 Pts, 4 PIM
25. Jenna Heitala (F), RoKi: 19 GP, 11 G, 6 A, 17 Pts, 6 PIM
27. Susanna Viitala (F), Sport: 16 GP, 10 G, 6 A, 16 Pts, 2 PIM
 49. Riikka Noronen (F), HPK: 19 GP, 2 G, 10 A, 12 Pts, 40 PIM
Elisa Holopainen was the leading point scorer in the preliminaries for the third consecutive season

Goaltenders

The following goaltenders lead the league in save percentage at the conclusion of the preliminary series on 12 December 2021, while starting at least one third of matches.

Vaasan Sport was the only team not represented in the top goaltenders table at the conclusion of the preliminary series. Sport’s best goaltender was Oona Mäki, who played in thirteen games and recorded a .860 save percentage and 7.38 goals against average.

Regular season 
The preliminary series began on 11 September and concluded on 12 December 2021. The Finnish Ice Hockey Association opted to use the points per game ranking system first implemented in the 2020–21 season to allow for the potential of cancelled matches due to the COVID-19 pandemic. Some games in the preliminary series were rescheduled, however, each team was able to play all twenty matches.

The top six ranked teams from the preliminary series advanced to the regular season, also called the upper division series, while teams ranked seventh through tenth progressed to the lower division series. The regular season began on 8 January 2022.

Standings

Official ranking

Teams are officially ranked by average points per game with ties broken by greater number of games played, followed by best goal difference, then greater number of goals.

Schedule

Player statistics 
Scoring leaders

The following players led the league in points at the conclusion of the regular season on 20 March 2022. In a change from the previous seasons, scoring statistics were carried over from the preliminaries and points scored in the regular season were added to those totals.

Goaltenders

The following goaltenders lead the league in save percentage at the conclusion of games played on 20 March 2022, while starting at least one third of matches. Goaltending statistics were not carried over from the preliminaries, only statistics accumulated in the regular season were counted towards totals.

Lower division series 
The teams ranked seventh through tenth in the Naisten Liiga preliminaries – HPK, KalPa, RoKi, and Sport – progressed to the lower division series, where they were joined by the top two teams from the Naisten Mestis cross-qualifiers, Alavuden Peli-Veikot (APV) and Rauman Lukko. The lower division series began on 5 February and concluded on 20 March. It was played as a double round-robin, with every team playing each of their five opponents twice. The two teams with the top points per game averages at the conclusion of the series, HPK and KalPa, progress to the playoff quarterfinals. The remaining four teams – APV, Lukko, RoKi, and Sport – proceed to the qualifiers, where they face potential relegation.

Standings
<onlyinclude>

Official ranking

Schedule

Player statistics 
Scoring leaders

The following players led the series in points at the conclusion of lower division play on 20 March 2022. No statistics were carried over from the preliminaries, all totals represent tallies from the lower division only. 

RoKi forward Jenna Hietala topped the scoring charts for both goals and points, with 18 goals and 24 points in 10 games played. Slovak forward Júlia Matejková of HPK and KalPa’s Johanna Juutilainen tied to lead the series in assists, both tallying 12 assists in 10 games played.

Rauman Lukko was the only team not represented in the scoring leaders table at the conclusion of the lower division series. Lukko’s top scorer was Roosa-Maria Kangasniemi, who notched 2 goals and 5 assists for 7 points in ten games played. She ranked 28th overall on the list of lower division scoring leaders.

Goaltenders

The following goaltenders lead the series in save percentage at the conclusion of lower division play on 20 March 2022, while starting at least one third of matches. Goaltending statistics were not carried over from the preliminaries, only statistics accumulated during the lower division series were considered.

Playoffs

Qualification series
The qualification series began on 26 March and concluded 10 April. 

Three teams from the 2021 qualification series returned to the promotion/relegation tournament in 2022: Lukko, RoKi, and Vaasan Sport. Promoted from the Naisten Mestis to the lower division series alongside Lukko, APV last appeared in the 2020 qualification series, in which they did not gain promotion. 

On April 3, Rovaniemen Kiekko (RoKi) and Rauman Lukko both amassed unbeatable point advantages and secured league positions. RoKi will remain in the Naisten Liiga for the 2022–23 season and Lukko will make their return to the league after being relegated to the Naisten Mestis in the 2020–21 Naisten Liiga qualifiers. 

Vaasan Sport will be relegated to the 2022–23 Naisten Mestis, following four seasons in the Naisten Liiga in which they qualified for the playoffs as the eighth-seed in 2020 and faced relegation in both 2021 and 2022. APV will return to the Naisten Mestis after missing out on the opportunity for promotion for the second time in three seasons.

Official ranking

Results

Statistics 
Scoring leaders

The following players led scoring in the qualification series at the conclusion of games played on 9 April 2022.

 

Leading goaltenders

The following goaltenders have played at least one match in the qualification series at the conclusion of games played on 9 April 2022, sorted by save percentage.

Awards and honours

Finnish Ice Hockey Association awards
 Riikka Nieminen Award (Player of the Year): Anni Keisala, Ilves
 Tuula Puputti Award (Best goaltender): Anni Keisala, Ilves
 Päivi Halonen Award (Best defenceman): Nelli Laitinen, Kiekko-Espoo
 Katja Riipi Award (Best forward): Elisa Holopainen, Kiekko-Espoo
 Noora Räty Award (Rookie of the Year): Tuuli Tallinen, Team Kuortane
 Marianne Ihalainen Award (Top point scorer): Estelle Duvin, TPS
 Tiia Reima Award (Top goal scorer): Matilda Nilsson, HIFK
 Sari Fisk Award (Best plus/minus): Kiira Yrjänen, Kiekko-Espoo
 Emma Laaksonen Award (Fair-play player): Emmanuelle Passard, HIFK
 Student Athlete Award: Emmi Rakkolainen, Kiekko-Espoo
 U18 Student Athlete Award: Oona Havana, Kärpät
 Hannu Saintula Award (Coach of the Year): Sami Haapanen, Kiekko-Espoo
 Karoliina Rantamäki Award (MVP of the Playoffs): Nelli Laitinen, Kiekko-Espoo
 Anu Hirvonen Award (Best referee): Johanna Tauriainen
 Johanna Suban Award (Best linesman): Linnea Sainio

Source: Finnish Ice Hockey Association

French forward Estelle Duvin of TPS claimed the Marianne Ihalainen Award as regular season scoring champion, amassing a staggering 31 goals and 26 assists for 57 points in 26 games played. She became the second international player to ever capture the honor, following Czech forward Michaela Pejzlová who won the award in 2021. HIFK Naiset winger Matilda Nilsson was the top goalscorer of the regular season, notching 37 goals in 29 games played and winning the Tiia Reima Award for the second consecutive season.

All-Star Teams

All-Star Team
 Goaltender: Anni Keisala, Ilves
 Defenceman: Nelli Laitinen, Kiekko-Espoo
 Defenceman: Sanni Rantala, Kiekko-Espoo
 Left Wing: Elisa Holopainen, Kiekko-Espoo
 Center: Estelle Duvin, TPS
 Right Wing: Kiira Yrjänen, Kiekko-Espoo

All-Star Team II
 Goaltender: Iina Kuusela, HIFK
 Defenceman: Krista Parkkonen, HIFK
 Defenceman: Oona Koukkula, Team Kuortane
 Left Wing: Sofianna Sundelin, Team Kuortane
 Center: Michaela Pejzlová, HIFK
 Right Wing: Matilda Nilsson, HIFK

Source: Finnish Ice Hockey Association

Player of the Month 

 September 2021: Kiira Yrjänen (F), Kiekko-Espoo
 October 2021: Estelle Duvin (F), TPS
 November 2021: Elisa Holopainen (F), Kiekko-Espoo
 December 2021: too few games played due to holiday break, no player named
 January 2022: number of games limited due to COVID-19 Omicron, no player named
 February/March 2022: Suvi Käyhkö (F), Kärpät

References

External links 
 Naisten Liiga official website 

2021–22
2021–22 in women's ice hockey leagues
Liiga Naiset
2021–22 in European ice hockey leagues